The 2023 United Kingdom pupil protests were a series of protests, demonstrations and riots which occurred across secondary schools in the United Kingdom in February-March 2023. The protests were held in opposition over some school rules, especially concerning the use of school toilets during lesson times and rules relating to school uniform. Videos of the protests were widely circulated on TikTok, with the platform also being used to organise and spread the protests.

Background

Rules regarding toilet use 
Prior to the protests, many schools had implemented rules restricting pupils from using school toilets during lesson time. Penrice Academy in St Austell, Cornwall had also implemented a "red card scheme", allowing female pupils who were on their period to use school toilets. This policy was heavily criticised by parents, and was accused of being "controlling and archaic", while Collumpton Community College in Devon had removed doors from toilet blocks in a bid to reduce anti-social behaviour. The Discovery Academy in Stoke-on-Trent had installed metal gates at the toilets which were locked during lesson times.

School uniform 
Other rules which provoked anger from students were regarding school uniform policies, partially rules around skirt length for female students. At Rainford high school in Merseyside, female students had their skirt length checked by male members of staff, proving anger from pupils and parents.

Protests 
Protests were held across the United Kingdom, with videos of protests being widely shared on TikTok. The platform, along with other social media platforms such as Snapchat, were also used to organise the protests. At Homeward School, Tenterden, in Kent, on 27 February, the police was called to help control the protests. Another protest on the same day in Neale-Wade Academy, Fenland led to bins and urine being thrown. At Penrice Academy, during a protest on 24 February, pupils wrecked goalposts and flipped tables, with one pupil being injured after attempting to scale a fence.

Response 
Headteachers condemned the protest, and told parents not to encourage protesting by their children. 

Conservative MP Jonathan Gullis blamed the protests on strike action being taken by teachers.

References 

2023 in the United Kingdom
Protests in the United Kingdom
Education in the United Kingdom
TikTok